Mount Vernon is a town in Faulkner County, Arkansas, United States. The population was 145 at the 2010 census. It is part of the Little Rock–North Little Rock–Conway Metropolitan Statistical Area.

Geography

Mount Vernon is located along the eastern edge of Faulkner County at  (35.224891, -92.124808). The eastern border of the town follows the White County line.

Arkansas Highway 36 passes through Mount Vernon, leading north  to Rose Bud, and southwest  to U.S. Route 64 at Hamlet.

Demographics

As of the census of 2000, there were 144 people, 57 households, and 44 families residing in the city. The population density was 55.6/km (143.9/mi2). There were 68 housing units at an average density of 26.3/km (68.0/mi2). The racial makeup of the city was 98.61% White, 0.69% from other races, and 0.69% from two or more races. 1.39% of the population were Hispanic or Latino of any race.

There were 57 households, out of which 33.3% had children under the age of 18 living with them, 63.2% were married couples living together, 14.0% had a female householder with no husband present, and 22.8% were non-families. 22.8% of all households were made up of individuals, and 10.5% had someone living alone who was 65 years of age or older. The average household size was 2.53 and the average family size was 2.98.

In the city the population was spread out, with 26.4% under the age of 888, 7.6% from 18 to 24, 20.8% from 25 to 44, 25.7% from 45 to 64, and 19.4% who were 65 years of age or older. The median age was 42 years. For every 100 females, there were 87.0 males. For every 100 females age 18 and over, there were 76.7 males.

The median income for a household in the city was $26,406, and the median income for a family was $40,625. Males had a median income of $28,750 versus $30,625 for females. The per capita income for the city was $12,593. There were none of the families and 4.9% of the population living below the poverty line, including no under eighteens and 12.9% of those over 64.

Education
Public education for elementary and secondary school students is provided by the Mount Vernon–Enola School District, Which leads to graduation from Mount Vernon–Enola High School. The district was formed by the July 1, 1991 consolidation of the Enola School District and the Mount Vernon School District.

See also

 List of cities and towns in Arkansas

References

External links

Towns in Faulkner County, Arkansas
Towns in Arkansas
Little Rock–North Little Rock–Conway metropolitan area